The Jupiter Conjunction is a Big Finish Productions audio drama based on the long-running British science fiction television series Doctor Who.

Plot
The TARDIS arrives on comet 8/Q Panenka, passing between Earth and Jupiter, in the year 2329.

Cast
The Doctor – Peter Davison
Tegan Jovanka – Janet Fielding
Nyssa – Sarah Sutton
Vislor Turlough – Mark Strickson
Patricia Walton – Rebecca Front
Anton Falcao – John Cummins
Chica St Jude – Ellie Burrow
Violet Silvaner – Zoe Lister
Major Nash – Ben Porter
Manny – Simon Blake
Jovians – Philip Pope

Critical reception
Doctor Who Magazine reviewer Matt Michael found the story to be "solid", but criticised the confusingly similar voices of Front, Burrow and Lister.

References

External links
The Jupiter Conjunction 

2012 audio plays
Fifth Doctor audio plays
Fiction set on Jupiter
Fiction set in the 24th century